DYSP (909 AM) Super Radyo is a radio station owned and operated by GMA Network. The station's studio is located along Solid Rd., Brgy. San Manuel, Puerto Princesa.

At present, DYSP is one of the top stations in the province.

References

External links

Super Radyo stations
Radio stations in Puerto Princesa
Radio stations established in 1996